The 2015–16 Liga Femenina de Baloncesto was the 53rd edition of the Spanish premier women's basketball championship. Regular season started on 26 September 2015 and will finish on 26 March 2016. The playoffs started on 30 March and finished no later than 23 April.

Perfumerías Avenida won its fourth title after defeating Spar Citylift Girona 2–1 in the Championship Finals.

Competition format 
The 14 teams play a home and away round-robin. The three first teams classified at the end of the first leg, together with the designated host play the Copa de la Reina de Baloncesto. If the host finishes between the three first teams, the fourth classified will also .

At the end of the regular season, the four first teams qualify for the playoffs, on a best of three series. The two last classified teams are relegated to Liga Femenina 2.

The League champion, the Cup champion, and the first team classified at the end of the regular season have guaranteed their participation in European competitions for the season 2016-2017.

The League champion and the Cup champion (or the Cup runner-up if the two first coincide), play for the following season's Supercopa of Spain of the following season.

Participating clubs 
At the end of the 2014–15 season, Campus Promete and CB Al-Qazeres Extremadura were relegated to Liga Femenina 2. Likewise, CREF ¡Hola! and Plenilunio Distrito Olímpico promoted. However, only the first one managed to gather the requirements for registration, therefore Campus Promete was offered the vacant spot. In addition, Rivas Ecópolis asked for relegation due to economic reasons. Its spot was filled by Iraurgi Saski Baloia, team that had not been admitted in Liga Femenina 2 before.

Regular season

League table

Positions by round
The table lists the positions of teams after completion of each round.

Playoffs

Semifinals

(1) Perfumerías Avenida vs. (4) Mann-Filter

(2) Conquero Huelva Wagen vs. (3) Spar Citylift Girona

Final

(1) Perfumerías Avenida vs. (3) Spar Citylift Girona

Stats leaders in regular season

Points

Rebounds

Assists

Performance Index Rating

References 

Liga Femenina de Baloncesto seasons
Femenina
Spain
Liga